Genêts is a commune in the department of Manche, in northwestern France. It was the port of the oppidum Ingena (now Avranches), the main settlement of the Abrincatui.

The Manoir de Brion, an ancient Benedictine priory of the abbey of Mont Saint-Michel is located nearby.

Demographic evolution

Administration

Mayors

See also
Communes of the Manche department

Notes

Communes of Manche